Duplicaria is a genus of sea snails, marine gastropod mollusks in the family Terebridae, the auger snails.

Species
Species within the genus Duplicaria include:

 † Duplicaria aequalis Harzhauser, Raven & Landau, 2018 
 Duplicaria albozonata (Smith, 1875)
 † Duplicaria angulifera (Marwick, 1931) 
 Duplicaria arenosa Terryn, 2021
 Duplicaria australis (Smith, 1873)
 Duplicaria badia (Deshayes, 1859)
 Duplicaria barrywilsoni Terryn, Marrow & H. Morrison, 2021
 † Duplicaria benesulcata (Bartrum, 1919) 
 Duplicaria bernardii (Deshayes, 1857)
 Duplicaria brevicula (Deshayes, 1859)
 Duplicaria barrywilsoni Terryn, Marrow & H. Morrison, 2021
 Duplicaria concolor (Smith, 1873)
 Duplicaria copula (Hinds, 1844)
 Duplicaria costellifera (Pease, 1869)
 Duplicaria crakei Burch, 1965
 Duplicaria darwini Terryn, Marrow & H. Morrison, 2021
 Duplicaria duplicata (Linnaeus, 1758)
 Duplicaria dussumierii (Kiener, 1839)
 Duplicaria evoluta (Deshayes, 1859)
 Duplicaria exmouthensis Terryn, Marrow & H. Morrison, 2021
 Duplicaria faustinatoi Terryn, 2021
 Duplicaria fictilis (Hinds, 1844)
 Duplicaria franknolfi Terryn, 2021
 Duplicaria gemmulata (Kiener, 1839)
 Duplicaria gianluigii Terryn, 2021
 Duplicaria helenae (Hinds, 1844)
 Duplicaria herberti Malcolm, Terryn & Fedosov, 2020
 Duplicaria hilutunganensis Terryn, 2021
 Duplicaria hubrechti Terryn & Chino, 2022
 Duplicaria ivanmarrowi Terryn, Marrow & H. Morrison, 2021
 Duplicaria hiradoensis (Pilsbry, 1921): synonym of Duplicaria evoluta (Deshayes, 1859)
 Duplicaria jukesi (Deshayes, 1857)
 Duplicaria juliae (Aubry, 1999)
 Duplicaria kellydhondtae Terryn, 2021
 Duplicaria kieneri (Deshayes, 1859)
 Duplicaria kirai (Oyama, 1962-a)
 Duplicaria kirstenae Terryn & Fraussen, 2019
 Duplicaria koreana (Yoo, 1976): synonym of Duplicaria badia (Deshayes, 1859)
 Duplicaria lamarckii (Kiener, 1837)
 Duplicaria lovelli Terryn, Marrow & H. Morrison, 2021
 Duplicaria monsecourorum Terryn, 2021
 Duplicaria latisulcata (Yokoyama, 1922) 
 Duplicaria morbida (Reeve, 1860)
 Duplicaria mozambiquensis Bratcher & Cernohorsky, 1982
 † Duplicaria omahuensis (Marwick, 1926) 
 Duplicaria peroni Terryn, Marrow & H. Morrison, 2021
 Duplicaria recticostata (Yokoyama, 1920) 
 Duplicaria reevei (Deshayes, 1857)
 Duplicaria remanalva (Melvill, 1910)
 Duplicaria richeri Terryn, 2021
 Duplicaria sharqiya Terryn, Rosado & Gori, 2020
 Duplicaria silvanae (Aubry, 1999)
 Duplicaria similis Smith, 1873
 Duplicaria slacksmithae Terryn, Marrow & H. Morrison, 2021
 Duplicaria sowerbyana (Deshayes, 1857)
 Duplicaria spectabilis (Hinds, 1844) 
 Duplicaria stevemarshalli Terryn, Marrow & H. Morrison, 2021
 Duplicaria timcordelli Terryn, Marrow & H. Morrison, 2021
 † Duplicaria timida (Marwick, 1931) 
 Duplicaria tricincta (E. A. Smith, 1877)
 Duplicaria tristis (Deshayes, 1859)
 Duplicaria ustulata (Deshayes, 1857)
 Duplicaria vandammei Terryn, Marrow & H. Morrison, 2021
 Duplicaria verhaeghei Terryn, 2021
 Duplicaria veronicae (Nicolay & Angioy, 1993)
 Duplicaria zanzibarica Terryn, 2021

Synonyms
 Duplicaria albofuscata (Bozzetti, 2008): synonym of Partecosta albofuscata (Bozzetti, 2008)
 Duplicaria angolensis (Aubry, 1999): synonym of Oxymeris senegalensis (Lamarck, 1822)
 Duplicaria anseeuwi (Terryn, 2005): synonym of Profunditerebra anseeuwi (Terryn, 2005)
 Duplicaria ballina Hedley, 1915: synonym of Strioterebrum ballinum (Hedley, 1915)
 Duplicaria baileyi Bratcher & Cernohorsky, 1982: synonym of Punctoterebra baileyi (Bratcher & Cernohorsky, 1982) (original combination)
 Duplicaria benthalis (Dall, 1889): synonym of Bathyterebra benthalis (Dall, 1889)
 Duplicaria bernardii (Deshayes, 1857): synonym of Duplicaria bernardi (Deshayes, 1857)
 Duplicaria capensis (E.A. Smith, 1873): synonym of Gradaterebra capensis (E.A. Smith, 1873)
 Duplicaria coriolisi (Aubry, 1999): synonym of Bathyterebra coriolisi (Aubry, 1999)
  Duplicaria deynzerorum Sprague, 2004: synonym of Hastula raphanula (Lamarck, 1822)
 Duplicaria dussumieri [sic]: synonym of Duplicaria dussumierii (Kiener, 1839)
 Duplicaria easmithi (Aubry, 1999): synonym of Gradaterebra easmithi (Aubry, 1999)
 Duplicaria flexicostata (Suter, 1909), Duplicaria propelevis (Ponder, 1968) and Duplicaria tristis (Deshayes, 1859) are synonyms for Euterebra tristis (Deshayes, 1859)
 Duplicaria gouldi (Deshayes, 1857): synonym of Oxymeris gouldi (Deshayes, 1857)
 Duplicaria luandensis (Aubry, 2008): synonym of Terebra luandensis Aubry, 2008
 Duplicaria nadinae (Aubry, 2008): synonym of Terebra nadinae Aubry, 2008
 Duplicaria pilsbryi (Aubry, 1999): synonym of Gradaterebra pilsbryi (Aubry, 1999)
 Duplicaria propelevis (Ponder, 1868): synonym of Euterebra tristis (Deshayes, 1859)
 Duplicaria raphanula (Lamarck, 1822 in 1815-22): synonym of Hastula raphanula (Lamarck, 1822)
 Duplicaria sinae Prelle, 2011: synonym of Oxymeris senegalensis (Lamarck, 1822)
 Duplicaria teramachii Burch, 1965: synonym of Punctoterebra teramachii (R. D. Burch, 1965) (original combination)
 Duplicaria thaanumi (Pilsbry, 1921): synonym of Oxymeris costellifera (Pease, 1869)
 Duplicaria tiurensis (Schepman, 1913): synonym of Terebra tiurensis Schepman, 1913
 Duplicaria trochlea (Deshayes, 1857): synonym of  Oxymeris trochlea (Deshayes, 1857)
 Duplicaria vallesia Hedley, 1912: synonym of Duplicaria bernardii (Deshayes, 1857)

References

 OBIS
 Powell A. W. B., New Zealand Mollusca, William Collins Publishers Ltd, Auckland, New Zealand 1979 
 Terryn, Y. (2007). Terebridae: A Collectors Guide. Conchbooks & Natural Art. 59pp + plates

External links
 Dall W.H. (1908). Subdivisions of the Terebridae. The Nautilus. 21(11): 124-125.

Terebridae
Gastropod genera
Taxa named by William Healey Dall